Omawumi Megbele (born 13 April 1982), known by her stage name Omawumi, is a Nigerian singer-songwriter and actress of Itsekiri ethnicity. She is a brand ambassador for Globacom, Konga.com, and Malta Guinness. She's also part of the campaign called "Rise with the Energy of Africa". She gained attention as the 2007 runner-up on West African Idols, a reality TV show part of the Idols franchise. Her second album, The Lasso of Truth, was reported to be a commercial success in Nigeria.

Early life 
Omawumi was born on 13 April 1982 to Chief Dr. Frank and Mrs. Aya Megbele.

Education 
She began her education at Nana Primary School during her pupilage, and later attended the College of Education Demonstration Secondary School. She graduated from Ambrose Alli University with a law degree. After graduating in 2005, she moved to Port Harcourt, Rivers State, where she worked with her family's law firm called "O.S Megbele & Associates". She also studied French at Alliance Francaise. She married Tosin Yusuf on 13 January 2018. She is the event convener at GLG Communications.

Career
Omawumi rose to prominence as a contestant on Idols West Africa. Omawumi was voted the 1st runner-up of the competition when it ended in May 2007. Since then, she has had numerous performances on the stage with musicians such as P-Square, 2face Idibia, Phyno, D'Banj, Banky W, M.I, Sasha, 9ice, Chaka Demus and Pliers, Carl Thomas, Angie Stone and Donell Jones, Angélique Kidjo, among others. In September 2008, Omawumi released her debut single "In The Music". Her album Wonderwoman was released on November 11, 2009. The album The Lasso of Truth was released on April 10, 2013.
 
The Lasso of Truth.

Her fourth album In Her Feelings was released on 14 June 2019,  which comprises Afro-fusion and Jazz to R&B, ‘In Her Feelings’ embodies tracks of multiple genres which include ‘For My Baby’, ‘Mr. Sinnerman’, ‘Away’, ‘True Loving’, ‘Tabansi’ and ‘Green Grass’.

Her single ‘Lituation’ was released on May 22, 2020. she dropped her 4th studio album tagged Love Deep High Life (LDHL) and containing features from phyno, waje, Brymo, and Ric Hassani.

Acting career
Even before Omawumi made her official debut in the world of make-believe, she has always incorporated the element of visual demonstration and dramatic elements into her music videos which in turn, deem her worthy of being a thespian and the movie roles that came her way. 
She kick-started with a role on stage in the 2009 edition of the V-Monologues. A literary work geared toward portraying the plights and struggles of women in Nigeria. She subsequently went on to score a role in Olurumbi, a Yoruba indigenous folktale and musical. She made her screen debut in 2010 with the high budget AMAA award-winning film, Inale. A Nigerian musical drama hosting an array of actors within Nollywood and Hollywood. She made her second appearance alongside Ice Prince, in the Ghanaian movie titled ‘House of Gold’ produced by Yvonne Nelson and directed by Pascal Amanfo in 2013.
In 2019, she leaped to venture into movie production as she joined forces with Waje to collaborate on a film project as co-producers. The movie titled ‘She Is’ directed by Eneng Enaji is an extension or replica of her humanitarian works and the values she has upheld and consistently communicated in her work of art. ‘She Is’ takes a ride through the societal standards, expectations and, restrictions a successful Nigerian woman is fa within Nigeria. The film is a presentational art that paints a picture as it is in the sociand raises questions and debates topics on possible solutions. She starred in the movie, alongside her co-producer.

Discography

Studio albums
Wonder Woman (2009)
Lasso of Truth (2013)
Timeless (2017)
Love Deep High Life (LDHL) (2021)

EPs
In Her Feelings (2019)

Singles
Lituation ft. Philkeyz (2020)

Filmography

Awards and nominations

References

External links

Musicians from Warri
Living people
1982 births
Actresses from Warri
21st-century Nigerian women singers
Nigerian women pop singers
Nigerian women singer-songwriters
Nigerian soul singers
The Headies winners
21st-century Nigerian actresses
Feminist musicians
Nigerian rhythm and blues singer-songwriters
Nigerian music industry executives
Nigerian film actresses
Ambrose Alli University alumni